Stephen Coast (born 20 December 1980) is a British entrepreneur and the founder of the OpenStreetMap community-based world mapping project and CloudMade, a geography-related company.

Early life
Coast grew up in Walderslade and London, United Kingdom.

Career

Coast interned at Wolfram Research before studying computing science at University College London (UCL).

In July 2004, he founded the OpenStreetMap project (OSM).

Coast set up Z.X.V. Ltd. with Nick Black, Tom Carden and Ben Gimpert as a technology consultancy in 2005. In 2008 this became CloudMade after investment by Nikolaj Nyholm and Sunstone Capital (company's website claims it was established in 2007). He resigned from CloudMade in October 2010, although he remained a shareholder.

On 23 November 2010, Coast announced that he had accepted a position as Principal Architect at Microsoft's Bing Mobile.

On 3 September 2013, Coast wrote on his blog that he had started to work for TeleNav, taking care of OSM development for the company's Scout navigator.

In March 2014, Coast became an advisor to Auth0, an identity-as-a-service provider.

In November 2015, Coast published "The Book of OSM". The book contains 15 interviews conducted by Coast with various users who had participated in the project since its beginning.

In January 2016, he stepped down from full-time work at TeleNav and started his work as a board advisor in Navmii. In March 2016 he started working as Chief Evangelist for what3words. In May 2016 he became an advisor in MapJam. In fall 2017, he joined DigitalGlobe. In spring 2019 he joined TomTom as a vice president in the Maps department.

Personal life
In 2008, Coast moved to the United States, first to San Francisco. In 2009 he moved to Colorado with his wife Hurricane (born McEwen). In November 2010 Coast wrote that he would be moving to Seattle, Washington. He moved back to Colorado in 2013.

References

External links
 Steve Coast's website and Blog

Living people
English businesspeople
Alumni of University College London
Collaborative mapping
Web mapping
Crowdsourcing
1980 births
OpenStreetMap people
English computer programmers
British technology company founders